The history of the United States from 1865 until 1918 covers the Reconstruction Era, the Gilded Age, and the Progressive Era, and includes the rise of industrialization and the resulting surge of immigration in the United States. This article focuses on political, economic, and diplomatic history.

This period of rapid economic growth and soaring prosperity in the Northern United States and the Western United States saw the U.S. become the world's dominant economic, industrial, and agricultural power. The average annual income (after inflation) of non-farm workers grew by 75% from 1865 to 1900, and then grew another 33% by 1918.

With a victory in 1865 over the Southern Confederate States in the Civil War, the United States became a united nation with a stronger national government. Reconstruction brought the end of legalized slavery plus citizenship for the former slaves, but their new-found political power was rolled back within a decade, and they became second-class citizens under a "Jim Crow" system of deeply pervasive segregation that would stand for the next 80–90 years. Politically, during the Third Party System and Fourth Party System the nation was mostly dominated by Republicans (except for two Democratic presidents). After 1900 and the assassination of President William McKinley, the Progressive Era brought political, business, and social reforms (e.g., new roles for and government expansion of education, higher status for women, a curtailment of corporate excesses, and modernization of many areas of government and society). The Progressives worked through new middle-class organizations to fight against the corruption and behind-the-scenes power of entrenched, state political party organizations and big-city "machines". They demanded—and won—women's right to vote, and the nationwide prohibition of alcohol 1920–1933.

In an unprecedented wave of European immigration, 27.5 million new arrivals between 1865 and 1918 provided the labor base necessary for the expansion of industry and agriculture, as well as the population base for most of fast-growing urban America.

By the late nineteenth century, the United States had become a leading global industrial power, building on new technologies (such as the telegraph and steel), an expanding railroad network, and abundant natural resources such as coal, timber, oil, and farmland, to usher in the Second Industrial Revolution.

There were also two very important wars. The U.S. easily defeated Spain in 1898, which unexpectedly brought a small empire. Cuba quickly was given independence, as well as the Philippines (in 1946). Puerto Rico (and some smaller islands) became permanent U.S. territories, as did Alaska (added by purchase in 1867).  The independent Republic of Hawaii was annexed by the U.S. as a territory in 1898.

The United States tried and failed to broker a peace settlement for World War I, then entered the war after Germany launched a submarine campaign against U.S. merchant ships that were supplying Germany's enemy countries. The publicly stated goals were to uphold American honor, crush German militarism, and reshape the postwar world. After a slow mobilization, the U.S. helped bring about a decisive Allied Forces victory by supplying badly needed financing, food, and millions of fresh and eager soldiers.

Reconstruction Era

Reconstruction was the period from 1863 to 1877, in which the federal government temporarily took control—one by one—of the Southern states of the Confederacy. Before his assassination in April 1865, President Abraham Lincoln had announced moderate plans for reconstruction to re-integrate the former Confederates as fast as possible. Lincoln set up the Freedmen's Bureau in March 1865, to aid former enslaved people in finding education, health care, and employment. The final abolition of slavery was achieved by the Thirteenth Amendment, ratified in December 1865. However, Lincoln was opposed by the Radical Republicans within his own party who feared that the former Confederates would never truly give up on slavery and Confederate nationalism, and would always try to reinstate them behind-the-scenes. As a result, the Radical Republicans tried to impose legal restrictions that would strip most ex-rebels' rights to vote and hold elected office. The Radicals were opposed by Lincoln's Vice President and successor, Tennessee Democrat Andrew Johnson. However, the Radicals won the critical elections of 1866, winning enough seats in Congress to override President Johnson's vetoes of such legislation. They even successfully impeached President Johnson (in the House of Representatives), and almost removed him from office (in the Senate) in 1868. Meanwhile, they gave the South's "freedmen" new constitutional and federal legal protections.

The Radicals' reconstruction plans took effect in 1867 under the supervision of the U.S. Army, allowing a Republican coalition of Freedmen, Scalawags (sympathetic local whites), and Carpetbaggers (recent arrivals from the North), to take control of Southern state governments. They ratified the Fourteenth Amendment, giving enormous new powers to the federal courts to deal with justice at the state level. These state governments borrowed heavily to build railroads and public schools, increasing taxation rates. The backlash of increasingly fierce opposition to these policies drove most of the Scalawags out of the Republican Party and into the Democratic Party. President Ulysses S. Grant enforced civil rights protections for African-Americans that were being challenged in South Carolina, Mississippi, and Louisiana. The Fifteenth Amendment was ratified in 1870 giving African-Americans the right to vote in American elections.

U.S. Representative Thaddeus Stevens was one of the major policymakers regarding Reconstruction, and obtained a House vote of impeachment against President Andrew Johnson. Hans Trefousse, his leading biographer, concludes that Stevens "was one of the most influential representatives ever to serve in Congress. [He dominated] the House with his wit, knowledge of parliamentary law, and sheer willpower, even though he was often unable to prevail."

Reconstruction ended at different times in each state, the last in 1877, when Republican Rutherford B. Hayes won the contentious presidential election of 1876 over his opponent, Samuel J. Tilden. To deal with disputed electoral votes, Congress set up an Electoral Commission. It awarded the disputed votes to Hayes. The white South accepted the "Compromise of 1877" knowing that Hayes proposed to end Army control over the remaining three state governments in Republican hands. White Northerners accepted that the Civil War was over and that Southern whites posed no threat to the nation.

The end of Reconstruction marked the end of the brief period of civil rights and civil liberties for African Americans in the South, where most lived. Reconstruction caused permanent resentment, distrust, and cynicism among white Southerners toward the federal government, and helped create the "Solid South," which typically voted for the (then-)socially conservative Democrats for all local, state, and national offices. White supremacists created a segregated society through "Jim Crow Laws" that made blacks second-class citizens with very little political power or public voice. The white elites (called the "Redeemers"—the southern wing of the "Bourbon Democrats") were in firm political and economic control of the south until the rise of the Populist movement in the 1890s. Local law enforcement was weak in rural areas, allowing outraged mobs to use lynching to redress alleged-but-often-unproven crimes charged to blacks.

Historians' interpretations of the Radical Republicans have dramatically shifted over the years, from the pre-1950 view of them as tools of big business motivated by partisanship and hatred of the white South, to the perspective of the neoabolitionists of the 1950s and afterwards, who applauded their efforts to give equal rights to the freed slaves.

In the South itself the interpretation of the tumultuous 1860s differed sharply by race. Americans often interpreted great events in religious terms. Historian Wilson Fallin contrasts the interpretation of Civil War and Reconstruction in white versus black using Baptist sermons in Alabama. White preachers expressed the view that:
 God had chastised them and given them a special mission – to maintain orthodoxy, strict Biblicism, personal piety, and traditional race relations. Slavery, they insisted, had not been sinful. Rather, emancipation was a historical tragedy and the end of Reconstruction was a clear sign of God's favor.
In sharp contrast, Black preachers interpreted the Civil War, emancipation and Reconstruction as:
 God's gift of freedom. They appreciated opportunities to exercise their independence, to worship in their own way, to affirm their worth and dignity, and to proclaim the fatherhood of God and the brotherhood of man. Most of all, they could form their own churches, associations, and conventions. These institutions offered self-help and racial uplift, and provided places where the gospel of liberation could be proclaimed. As a result, black preachers continued to insist that God would protect and help them; God would be their rock in a stormy land.

Historians in the 21st century typically consider Reconstruction to be a failure, but they "disagree on what caused Reconstruction to fail, focusing on whether it went too far, too fast or did not go far enough."

However, historian Mark Summers in 2014 sees a positive outcome:
if we see Reconstruction's purpose as making sure that the main goals of the war would be filled, of a Union held together forever, of a North and South able to work together, of slavery extirpated, and sectional rivalries confined, of a  permanent banishment of the fear of vaunting appeals to state sovereignty, backed by armed force, then Reconstruction looks like what in that respect it was, a lasting and unappreciated success.

The West

In 1869, the First transcontinental railroad opened up the far west mining and ranching regions. Travel from New York to San Francisco now took six days instead of six months. After the Civil War, many from the East Coast and Europe were lured west by reports from relatives and by extensive advertising campaigns promising "the Best Prairie Lands", "Low Prices", "Large Discounts For Cash", and "Better Terms Than Ever!". The new railroads provided the opportunity for migrants to go out and take a look, with special family tickets, the cost of which could be applied to land purchases offered by the railroads. Farming the plains was indeed more difficult than back east. Water management was more critical, lightning fires were more prevalent, the weather was more extreme, rainfall was less predictable. The fearful stayed home. The actual migrants looked beyond fears of the unknown. Their chief motivation to move west was to find a better economic life than the one they had. Farmers sought larger, cheaper and more fertile land; merchants and tradesmen sought new customers and new leadership opportunities. Laborers wanted higher paying work and better conditions. With the Homestead Act providing free land to citizens and the railroads selling cheap lands to European farmers, the settlement of the Great Plains was swiftly accomplished, and the frontier had virtually ended by 1890.

American Indian assimilation

Expansion into the plains and mountains by miners, ranchers and settlers led to conflict with some of the regional Indian tribes. The government insisted the American Indians either move into the general society and become assimilated, or remain on assigned reservations. The Army used force to keep those choosing reservation life from threatening nearby tribes or settlers.   The violence petered out in the 1880s and practically ceased after 1890. By 1880 the buffalo herds, a foundation for the hunting economy, had disappeared.

American Indians had the choice of living on reservations. The US government provided food, supplies, education and medical care. Individuals could move out on their own in Western society and earning wages, typically on a ranch. Reformers wanted to give as many American Indians as possible the opportunity to own and operate their own farms and ranches, and the issue was how to give individual Indians land owned by the tribe. To assimilate the Indians into American society, reformers set up training programs and schools, such as the Carlisle Indian Industrial School in Carlisle, Pennsylvania, that produced many prominent Indian leaders. The anti-assimilation traditionalists on the reservations, however, resisted integration. The reformers decided the solution was to allow Indians still on reservations to own land as individuals.

The Dawes Act of 1887 was an effort to integrate American Indians into the mainstream; the majority accepted integration and were absorbed into American society, leaving a trace of American Indian ancestry in millions of American families. Those who refused to assimilate remained in poverty on the reservations, supported by Federal food, medicine and schooling. In 1934, U.S. policy was reversed again by the Indian Reorganization Act which attempted to protect tribal and communal life on the reservations.

Farming

A dramatic expansion in farming took place. The number of farms tripled from 2.0 million in 1860 to 6.0 million in 1905. The number of people living on farms grew from about 10 million in 1860 to 22 million in 1880 to 31 million in 1905. The value of farms soared from $8.0 billion in 1860 to $30 billion in 1906.

The federal government issued  tracts virtually free to settlers under the Homestead Act of 1862. Even larger numbers purchased lands at very low interest from the new railroads, which were trying to create markets. The railroads advertised heavily in Europe and brought over, at low fares, hundreds of thousands of farmers from Germany, Scandinavia and Britain.

Despite their remarkable progress and general prosperity, 19th-century U.S. farmers experienced recurring cycles of hardship, caused primarily by falling world prices for cotton and wheat.

Along with the mechanical improvements which greatly increased yield per unit area, the amount of land under cultivation grew rapidly throughout the second half of the century, as the railroads opened up new areas of the West for settlement. The wheat farmers enjoyed abundant output and good years from 1876 to 1881 when bad European harvests kept the world price high. They then suffered from a slump in the 1880s when conditions in Europe improved. The farther west the settlers went, the more dependent they became on the monopolistic railroads to move their goods to market, and the more inclined they were to protest, as in the Populist movement of the 1890s. Wheat farmers blamed local grain elevator owners (who purchased their crop), railroads and eastern bankers for the low prices.

The first organized effort to address general agricultural problems was the Grange movement that reached out to farmers. It grew to 20,000 chapters and 1.5 million members. The Granges set up their own marketing systems, stores, processing plants, factories and cooperatives. Most went bankrupt. The movement also enjoyed some political success during the 1870s. A few Midwestern states passed "Granger Laws", limiting railroad and warehouse fees.

Family life
Few single men attempted to operate a farm; farmers clearly understood the need for a hard-working wife, and numerous children, to handle the many chores, including child-rearing, feeding and clothing the family, managing the housework, and feeding the hired hands. During the early years of settlement, farm women played an integral role in assuring family survival by working outdoors. After a generation or so, women increasingly left the fields, thus redefining their roles within the family. New conveniences such as sewing and washing machines encouraged women to turn to domestic roles. This was further supported by the scientific housekeeping movement, promoted across the land by the media and government extension agents, as well as county fairs which featured achievements in home cookery and canning, advice columns for women in the farm papers, and home economics courses in the schools.

Although the eastern image of farm life on the prairies emphasizes the isolation of the lonely farmer and farm life, in reality rural folk created a rich social life for themselves. For example, many joined a local branch of the Grange; a majority had ties to local churches. It was popular to organize activities that combined practical work, abundant food, and simple entertainment such as barn raisings, corn huskings, and quilting bees,. One could keep busy with scheduled Grange meetings, church services, and school functions. The womenfolk organized shared meals and potluck events, as well as extended visits between families.

Childhood on the American frontier is contested territory. One group of scholars argues the rural environment was salubrious for it allowed children to break loose from urban hierarchies of age and gender, promoted family interdependence, and in the end produced children who were more self-reliant, mobile, adaptable, responsible, independent and more in touch with nature than their urban or eastern counterparts. However other historians offer a grim portrait of loneliness, privation, abuse, and demanding physical labor from an early age.

Industrialization

From 1865 to about 1913, the U.S. grew to become the world's leading industrial nation. Land and labor, the diversity of climate, the ample presence of railroads (as well as navigable rivers), and the natural resources all fostered the cheap extraction of energy, fast transport, and the availability of capital that powered this Second Industrial Revolution. The average annual income (after inflation) of non-farm workers grew by 75% from 1865 to 1900, and then grew another 33% by 1918.

Where the First Industrial Revolution shifted production from artisans to factories, the Second Industrial Revolution pioneered an expansion in organization, coordination, and the scale of industry, spurred on by technology and transportation advancements. Railroads opened the West, creating farms, towns, and markets where none had existed. The First transcontinental railroad, built by nationally oriented entrepreneurs with British money and Irish and Chinese labor, provided access to previously remote expanses of land. Railway construction boosted opportunities for capital, credit, and would-be farmers.

New technologies in iron and steel manufacturing, such as the Bessemer process and open-hearth furnace, combined with similar innovations in chemistry and other sciences to vastly improve productivity. New communication tools, such as the telegraph and telephone allowed corporate managers to coordinate across great distances. Innovations also occurred in how work was organized, typified by Frederick Winslow Taylor's ideas of scientific management.

To finance the larger-scale enterprises required during this era, the corporation emerged as the dominant form of business organization. Corporations expanded by merging, creating single firms out of competing firms known as "trusts" (a form of monopoly). High tariffs sheltered U.S. factories and workers from foreign competition, especially in the woolen industry. Federal railroad land grants enriched investors, farmers and railroad workers, and created hundreds of towns and cities. Business often went to court to stop labor from organizing into unions or from organizing strikes.

Powerful industrialists, such as Andrew Carnegie, John D. Rockefeller and Jay Gould, known collectively by their critics as "robber barons", held great wealth and power, so much so that in 1888 Rutherford B. Hayes noted in his diary that the United States ceased being a government for the people and had been replaced by a "government of the corporation, by the corporation, and for the corporation." In a context of cutthroat competition for wealth accumulation, the skilled labor of artisans gave way to well-paid skilled workers and engineers, as the nation deepened its technological base. Meanwhile, a steady stream of immigrants encouraged the availability of cheap labor, especially in mining and manufacturing.

Labor and management
In the fast-growing industrial sector, wages were about double the level in Europe, but the work was harder with less leisure. Economic depressions swept the nation in 1873–75 and 1893–97, with low prices for farm goods and heavy unemployment in factories and mines. Full prosperity returned in 1897 and continued (with minor dips) to 1920.

The pool of unskilled labor was constantly growing, as unprecedented numbers of immigrants—27.5 million between 1865 and 1918 —entered the U.S. Most were young men eager for work. The rapid growth of engineering and the need to master the new technology created a heavy demand for engineers, technicians, and skilled workers. Before 1874, when Massachusetts passed the nation's first legislation limiting the number of hours women and child factory workers could perform to 10 hours a day, virtually no labor legislation existed in the country. Child labor reached a peak around 1900 and then declined (except in Southern textile mills) as compulsory education laws kept children in school. It was finally ended in the 1930s.

Labor organization

The first major effort to organize workers' groups on a nationwide basis appeared with The Noble Order of the Knights of Labor in 1869. Originally a secret, ritualistic society organized by Philadelphia garment workers, it was open to all workers, including African Americans, women, and farmers. The Knights grew slowly until they succeeded in facing down the great railroad baron, Jay Gould, in an 1885 strike. Within a year, they added 500,000 workers to their rolls, far more than the thin leadership structure of the Knights could handle.

The Knights of Labor soon fell into decline, and their place in the labor movement was gradually taken by the American Federation of Labor (AFL). Rather than open its membership to all, the AFL, under former cigar-makers union official Samuel Gompers, focused on skilled workers. His objectives were "pure and simple": increasing wages, reducing hours, and improving working conditions. As such, Gompers helped turn the labor movement away from the socialist views earlier labor leaders had espoused. The AFL would gradually become a respected organization in the U.S., although it would have nothing to do with unskilled laborers.

In times of economic depression, layoffs and wage cuts angered the workers, leading to violent labor conflicts in 1877 and 1894. In the Great Railroad Strike in 1877, railroad workers across the nation went on strike in response to a 10-percent pay cut. Attempts to break the strike led to bloody uprisings in several cities. The Haymarket Riot took place in 1886, when an anarchist allegedly threw a bomb that killed several police dispersing a strike rally at the McCormick Harvesting Machine Company in Chicago. Anarchists were arrested and convicted, weakening the movement.

At its peak, the Knights claimed 700,000 members. By 1890, membership had plummeted to fewer than 100,000, then faded away. The killing of policemen greatly embarrassed the Knights of Labor, which was not involved with the bomb but which took much of the blame.

In the riots of 1892 at Carnegie's steel works in Homestead, Pennsylvania, a group of 300 Pinkerton detectives, whom the company had hired to break a bitter strike by the Amalgamated Association of Iron, Steel and Tin Workers, were fired upon by strikers and 10 were killed. As a result, the National Guard was called in to guard the plant; non-union workers were hired and the strike broken. The Homestead plant completely barred unions until 1937.

Two years later, wage cuts at the Pullman Palace Car Company, just outside Chicago, led to a strike, which, with the support of the American Railway Union, soon brought the nation's railway industry to a halt. The shutdown of rail traffic meant the virtual shutdown of the entire national economy, and President Grover Cleveland acted vigorously. He secured injunctions in federal court, which Eugene Debs and the other strike leaders ignored. Cleveland then sent in the Army to stop the rioting and get the trains moving. The strike collapsed, as did the ARU.

The most militant working class organization of the 1905–1920 era was the Industrial Workers of the World (IWW), formed largely in response to abysmal labor conditions (in 1904, the year before its founding, 27,000 workers were killed on the job) and discrimination against women, minorities, and unskilled laborers by other unions, particularly the AFL. The "Wobblies," as they were commonly known, gained particular prominence from their incendiary and revolutionary rhetoric. Openly calling for class warfare, direct action, workplace democracy and "One Big Union" for all workers regardless of sex, race or skills, the Wobblies gained many adherents after they won a difficult 1912 textile strike (commonly known as the "Bread and Roses" strike) in Lawrence, Massachusetts. They proved ineffective in managing peaceful labor relations and members dropped away, primarily because the union failed to build long-term worker organizations even after a successful campaign, leaving the workers involved at the mercy of employers once the IWW had moved on. However, this was not fatal to the union. That the IWW directly challenged capitalism via direct action at the point of production prompted swift and decisive action from the state, especially during and after World War I. According to historian Howard Zinn, "the IWW became a threat to the capitalist class, exactly when capitalist growth was enormous and profits huge." The IWW strongly opposed the 1917–18 war effort and faced a campaign of repression from the federal government.  More than a few Wobblies, such as Frank Little, were beaten or lynched by mobs or died in American jails.

Gilded Age

The "Gilded Age" that was enjoyed by the topmost percentiles of American society after the recovery from the Panic of 1873 floated on the surface of the newly industrialized economy of the Second Industrial Revolution. It was further fueled by a period of wealth transfer that catalyzed dramatic social changes. It created for the first time a class of the super-rich "captains of industry", the "robber barons" whose network of business, social and family connections ruled a largely White Anglo-Saxon Protestant social world that possessed clearly defined boundaries. The term "Gilded Age" was coined by Mark Twain and Charles Dudley Warner in their 1873 book, The Gilded Age: A Tale of Today, employing the ironic difference between a "gilded" and a Golden Age.

With the end of Reconstruction, there were few major political issues at stake and the 1880 presidential election was the quietest in a long time. James Garfield, the Republican candidate, won a very close election, but a few months into his administration was shot by a disgruntled public office seeker. Garfield  was succeeded by his VP Chester Arthur.

Reformers, especially the "Mugwumps" complained that powerful parties made for corruption during the Gilded Age or "Third Party System". Voter enthusiasm and turnout during the period 1872–1892 was very high, often reaching practically all men. The major issues involved modernization, money, railroads, corruption, and prohibition. National elections, and many state elections, were very close. The 1884 presidential election saw a mudslinging campaign in which  Republican James G. Blaine was defeated by Democrat Grover Cleveland, a reformer. During Cleveland's presidency, he pushed to have congress cut tariff duties. He also expanded civil services and vetoed many private pension bills. Many people were worried that these issues would hurt his chances in the 1888 election. When they expressed these concerns to Cleveland, he said "What is the use of being elected or reelected, unless you stand for something?"

The dominant social class of the Northeast possessed the confidence to proclaim an "American Renaissance", which could be identified in the rush of new public institutions that marked the period—hospitals, museums, colleges, opera houses, libraries, orchestras— and by the Beaux-Arts architectural idiom in which they splendidly stood forth, after Chicago hosted the World's Columbian Exposition of 1893.

Social history
Urbanization (the rapid growth of cities) went hand in hand with industrialization (the growth of factories and railroads), as well as expansion of farming. The rapid growth was made possible by high levels of immigration.

Immigration

From 1865 through 1918 an unprecedented and diverse stream of immigrants arrived in the United States, 27.5 million in total. In all, 24.4 million (89%) came from Europe, including 2.9 million from Great Britain, 2.2 million from Ireland, 2.1 million from Scandinavia, 3.8 million from Germany, 4.1 million from Italy, 7.8 million from Russia and other parts of Central and Eastern Europe. Another 1.7 million came from Canada. Most came through the port of New York City, and from 1892, through the immigration station on Ellis Island, but various ethnic groups settled in different locations. New York and other large cities of the East Coast became home to large Jewish, Irish, and Italian populations, while many Germans and Central Europeans moved to the Midwest, obtaining jobs in industry and mining. At the same time, about one million French Canadians migrated from Quebec to New England.

Immigrants were pushed out of their homelands by poverty or religious threats, and pulled to America by jobs, farmland  and kin connections. They found economic opportunity at factories, mines and construction sites, and found farm opportunities in the Plains states.

While most immigrants were welcomed, Asians were not. Many Chinese had been brought to the west coast to construct railroads, but unlike European immigrants, they were seen as being part of an entirely alien culture. After intense anti-Chinese agitation in California and the west, Congress passed the Chinese Exclusion Act in 1882. An informal agreement in 1907, the Gentlemen's Agreement, stopped Japanese immigration.

Some immigrants stayed temporarily in the U.S. then returned home, often with savings that made them relatively prosperous. Most, however, permanently left their native lands and stayed in hope of finding a better life in the New World. This desire for freedom and prosperity led to the famous term, the American Dream.

Religion

The Third Great Awakening was a period of renewal in Evangelical Protestantism from the late 1850s to the 1900s. It affected pietistic Protestant denominations and had a strong sense of social activism. It gathered strength from the postmillennial theology that the Second Coming of Christ would come after mankind had reformed the entire earth. A major component was the Social Gospel Movement, which applied Christianity to social issues and gained its force from the Awakening, as did the worldwide missionary movement. New groupings emerged, such as the Holiness movement and Nazarene movements, and Christian Science.

At the same time, the Catholic Church grew rapidly, with a base in the German, Irish, Polish, and Italian immigrant communities, and a leadership drawn from the Irish. The Catholics were largely working class and concentrated in the industrial cities and mining towns, where they built churches, parochial schools, and charitable institutions, as well as colleges.

The Jewish community grew rapidly, especially from the new arrivals from Eastern Europe who settled chiefly in New York City. They avoided the Reform synagogues of the older German Jews and instead formed Orthodox and Conservative synagogues.

Nadir of race relations

Starting in the end of the 1870s, African Americans lost many of the civil rights obtained during Reconstruction and became increasingly subject to racial discrimination. Increased racist violence, including lynchings and race riots, lead to a strong deterioration of living conditions of African Americans in the Southern states. Jim Crow laws were established after the Compromise of 1877. Many decided to flee for the Midwest as early as 1879, an exile which was intensified during the Great Migration that began before World War I.

In 1896, the U.S. Supreme Court effectively upheld the Jim Crow system of  racial segregation by its "separate but equal" doctrine.

D. W. Griffith's The Birth of a Nation (1915), the first great American film, made heroes of the KKK in Reconstruction.

Populism

By 1880, the Granger movement began to decline and was replaced by the Farmers' Alliance. From the beginning, the Farmers' Alliance were political organizations with elaborate economic programs. According to one early platform, its purpose was to "unite the farmers of America for their protection against class legislation and the encroachments of concentrated capital." Their program also called for the regulation—if not the outright nationalization—of the railroads; currency inflation to provide debt relief; the lowering of the tariff; and the establishment of government-owned storehouses and low-interest lending facilities. These were known as the Ocala Demands.

During the late 1880s, a series of droughts devastated the West. Western Kansas lost half its population during a four-year span. By 1890, the level of agrarian distress was at an all-time high. Mary Elizabeth Lease, a noted populist writer and agitator, told farmers that they needed to "raise less corn and more hell". Working with sympathetic Democrats in the South and small third parties in the West, the Farmer's Alliance made a push for political power. From these elements, a new political party, known as the Populist Party, emerged. The elections of 1890 brought the new party into coalitions that controlled parts of state government in a dozen Southern and Western states and sent a score of Populist senators and representatives to Congress.

Its first convention was in 1892, when delegates from farm, labor and reform organizations met in Omaha, Nebraska, determined at last to make their mark on a U.S. political system that they viewed as hopelessly corrupted by the monied interests of the industrial and commercial trusts.

The pragmatic portion of the Populist platform focused on issues of land, railroads and money, including the unlimited coinage of silver. The Populists showed impressive strength in the West and South in the 1892 elections, and their candidate for President polled more than a million votes. It was the currency question, however, pitting advocates of silver against those who favored gold, that soon overshadowed all other issues. Agrarian spokesmen in the West and South demanded a return to the unlimited coinage of silver. Convinced that their troubles stemmed from a shortage of money in circulation, they argued that increasing the volume of money would indirectly raise prices for farm products and drive up industrial wages, thus allowing debts to be paid with inflated dollars.

Conservative groups and the financial classes, on the other hand, believed that such a policy would be disastrous, and they insisted that inflation, once begun, could not be stopped. Railroad bonds, the most important financial instrument of the time, were payable in gold. If fares and freight rates were set in half-price silver dollars, railroads would go bankrupt in weeks, throwing hundreds of thousands of men out of work and destroying the industrial economy. Only the gold standard, they said, offered stability.

The financial Panic of 1893 heightened the tension of this debate. Bank failures abounded in the South and Midwest; unemployment soared and crop prices fell badly. The crisis, and President Cleveland's inability to solve it, nearly broke the Democratic Party.

The Democratic Party, which supported silver and free trade, absorbed the remnants of the Populist movement as the presidential elections of 1896 neared. The Democratic convention that year was witness to one of the most famous speeches in U.S. political history. Pleading with the convention not to "crucify mankind on a cross of gold", William Jennings Bryan, the young Nebraskan champion of silver, won the Democrats' presidential nomination. The remaining Populists also endorsed Bryan, hoping to retain some influence by having a voice inside the Bryan movement. Despite carrying the South and all the West except California and Oregon, Bryan lost the more populated, industrial North and East—and the election—to the Republican William McKinley with his campaign slogan "A Full Dinner Pail".

In 1897 the economy began to improve, mostly from restored business confidence. Silverites—who did not realize that most transactions were handled by bank checks, not sacks of gold—believed the new prosperity was spurred by the discovery of gold in the Yukon. In 1898, the Spanish–American War drew the nation's attention further away from Populist issues. If the movement was dead, however, its ideas were not. Once the Populists supported an idea, it became so tainted that the vast majority of American politicians rejected it; only years later, after the taint had been forgotten, was it possible to achieve Populist reforms, such as the direct popular election of Senators in 1914.

Women's suffrage

The women's suffrage movement began with the 1848 Seneca Falls Convention; many of the activists became politically aware during the abolitionist movement. The movement reorganized after the Civil War, gaining experienced campaigners, many of whom had worked for prohibition in the Women's Christian Temperance Union. By the end of the 19th century a few western states had granted women full voting rights, though women had made significant legal victories, gaining rights in areas such as property and child custody.

Around 1912, the movement, which had grown sluggish, began to reawaken. This put an emphasis on its demands for equality and arguing that the corruption of American politics demanded purification by women because men could no longer do their job. Protests became increasingly common as suffragette Alice Paul led parades through the capitol and major cities. Paul split from the large National American Woman Suffrage Association (NAWSA), which favored a more moderate approach and supported the Democratic Party and Woodrow Wilson, led by Carrie Chapman Catt, and formed the more militant National Woman's Party. Suffragists were arrested during their "Silent Sentinels" pickets at the White House, the first time such a tactic was used, and were taken as political prisoners.

Finally, the suffragettes were ordered released from prison, and Wilson urged Congress to pass a Constitutional amendment enfranchising women. The old anti-suffragist argument that only men could fight a war, and therefore only men deserved the franchise, was refuted by the enthusiastic participation of tens of thousands of American women on the home front in World War I. Across the world, grateful nations gave women the right to vote. Furthermore, most of the Western states had already given women the right to vote in state and national elections, and the representatives from those states, including the first voting woman Jeannette Rankin of Montana, demonstrated that Women's Suffrage was a success. The main resistance came from the south, where white leaders were worried about the threat of black women voting. Nevertheless, Congress passed the Nineteenth Amendment in 1919. It became a constitutional law on August 26, 1920, after ratification by the 36th required state.

Foreign policy

With the landslide election victory of William McKinley, who had risen to national prominence six years earlier with the passage of the McKinley Tariff of 1890, a high tariff was passed in 1897 and a decade of rapid economic growth and prosperity ensued, building national self-confidence. McKinley brought in a new governing philosophy, one that dominated the 20th century, in which politics was the arena in which compromises among interest groups were worked out for the national benefit. His system of politics emphasized economic growth, prosperity for all, and pluralism that provided benefits for every group. He rejected programs such as prohibition and immigration restriction that were designed to hurt an enemy. He felt parties had the duty to enact the people's will and educate them to new ideas.

War with Spain

Spain had once controlled a vast colonial empire, but by the second half of the 19th century only Cuba, Puerto Rico, the Philippines, and some African possessions remained: Spanish West Africa (Spanish Sahara), Spanish Guinea, Spanish Morocco and the Canary Islands. The Cubans had been in a state of rebellion since the 1870s, and American newspapers, particularly New York City papers of William Randolph Hearst and Joseph Pulitzer, printed sensationalized "Yellow Journalism" stories about Spanish atrocities in Cuba. However, these lurid stories reached only a small fraction of voters; most read sober accounts of Spanish atrocities, and they called for intervention. On February 15, 1898, the battleship USS Maine exploded in Havana Harbor. Although it was unclear precisely what caused the blast, many Americans believed it to be the work of a Spanish mine, an attitude encouraged by the yellow journalism of Hearst and Pulitzer. The military was rapidly mobilized as the U.S. prepared to intervene in the Cuban revolt. It was made clear that no attempt at annexation of Cuba would be made and that the island's independence would be guaranteed. Spain considered this a wanton intervention in its internal affairs and severed diplomatic relations. War was declared on April 25.

The Spanish were quickly defeated, and Theodore Roosevelt's Rough Riders gained fame in Cuba. Meanwhile, Commodore George Dewey's fleet crushed the Spanish in the faraway Philippines. Spain capitulated, ending the three-month-long war and recognizing Cuba's independence. Puerto Rico, Guam, and the Philippines were ceded to the United States.

Although U.S. capital investments within the Philippines and Puerto Rico were small, some politicians hoped they would be strategic outposts for expanding trade with Latin America and Asia, particularly China. That never happened and after 1903 American attention turned to the Panama Canal as the key to opening new trade routes. The Spanish–American War thus began the active, globally oriented American foreign policy that continues to the present day.

Philippines

The U.S. acquired the Philippines from Spain on December 10, 1898, via the Treaty of Paris, which ended the Spanish–American War. However, Philippine revolutionaries led by Emilio Aguinaldo declared independence and in 1899 began fighting the U.S. troops. The Philippine–American War ended in 1901 after Aguinaldo was captured and swore allegiance to the U.S. Likewise the other insurgents accepted American rule and peace prevailed, except in some remote islands under Muslim control. Roosevelt continued the McKinley policies of removing the Catholic friars (with compensation to the Pope), upgrading the infrastructure, introducing public health programs, and launching a program of economic and social modernization. The enthusiasm shown in 1898–99 for colonies cooled off, and Roosevelt saw the islands as "our heel of Achilles." He told Taft in 1907, "I should be glad to see the islands made independent, with perhaps some kind of international guarantee for the preservation of order, or with some warning on our part that if they did not keep order we would have to interfere again." By then the President and his foreign policy advisers turned away from Asian issues to concentrate on Latin America, and Roosevelt redirected Philippine policy to prepare the islands to become the first Western colony in Asia to achieve self-government. The Filipinos fought side by side with the Americans when the Japanese invaded in 1941, and aided the American re-conquest of the islands in 1944–45; independence came in 1946.

Latin America

The U.S. demanded Spain stop its oppressive policies in Cuba; public opinion (overruling McKinley) led to the short, successful Spanish–American War in 1898. The U.S. permanently took over Puerto Rico, and temporarily held Cuba. Attention increasingly focused on the Caribbean as the rapid growth of the Pacific states, especially California, revealed the need for a canal across to connect the Atlantic and Pacific Oceans. Plans for one in Nicaragua fell through but under Roosevelt's leadership the U.S. built a canal through Panama, after finding a public health solution to the deadly disease environment. The Panama Canal opened in 1914.

In 1904, Roosevelt announced his "Corollary" to the Monroe Doctrine, stating that the United States would intervene in cases where Latin American governments prove incapable or unstable in the interest of bringing democracy and financial stability to them. The U.S. made numerous interventions, mostly to stabilize the shaky governments and permit the nations to develop their economies. The intervention policy ended in the 1930s and was replaced by the Good Neighbor policy.

In 1909, Nicaraguan President José Santos Zelaya resigned after the triumph of U.S.-backed rebels. This was followed up by the 1912–1933 U.S. occupation of Nicaragua.

The U.S. military occupation of Haiti, in 1915, followed the mob execution of Haiti's leader Vilbrun Guillaume Sam but even more important was the threat of a possible German takeover of the island. Germans controlled 80% of the Haitian economy by 1914 and they were bankrolling revolutions that kept the country in political turmoil. The conquest resulted in a 19-year-long United States occupation of Haiti. Haiti was an exotic locale that suggested black racial themes to numerous American writers including Eugene O'Neill, James Weldon Johnson, Langston Hughes, Zora Neale Hurston and Orson Welles.

Limited American intervention occurred in Mexico as that country fell into a long period of anarchy and civil war starting in 1910. In April 1914, U.S. troops occupied the Mexican port of Veracruz following the Tampico Incident; the reason for the intervention was Woodrow Wilson's desire to overthrow the Mexican dictator Victoriano Huerta. In March 1916, Pancho Villa led 1,500 Mexican raiders in a cross-border attack against Columbus, New Mexico, attacked a U.S. Cavalry detachment, seized 100 horses and mules, burned the town, and killed 17 of its residents. President Woodrow Wilson responded by sending 12,000 troops, under Gen. John J. Pershing, into Mexico to pursue Villa. The Pancho Villa Expedition to capture Villa failed in its objectives and was withdrawn in January 1917.

In 1916, the U.S. occupied the Dominican Republic.

Progressive Era

A new spirit of the times, known as "Progressivism", arose in the 1890s and into the 1920s (although some historians date the ending with World War I).

In 1904, reflecting the age, and perhaps prescient of difficulties arising in the early part of the next millennium (including the rise of a Demagogue in the land trying to array society into two camps), the Hungarian born Joseph Pulitzer wrote about the dangers ahead for the republic:

"Our Republic and its press will rise or fall together. An able, disinterested, public-spirited press, with trained intelligence to know the right and courage to do it, can preserve that public virtue without which popular government is a sham and a mockery. A cynical, mercenary, demagogic press will produce in time a people as base as itself. The power to mould the future of the Republic will be in the hands of the journalists of future generations.”

The presidential election of 1900 gave the U.S. a chance to pass judgment on the McKinley Administration, especially its foreign policy. Meeting at Philadelphia, the Republicans expressed jubilation over the successful outcome of the war with Spain, the restoration of prosperity, and the effort to obtain new markets through the Open Door Policy. The 1900 election was mostly a repeat of 1896 except for imperialism being added as a new issue (Hawaii had been annexed in 1898). William Jennings Bryan added anti-imperialism to his tired-out free silver rhetoric, but he was defeated in the face of peace, prosperity and national optimism.

President William McKinley was enjoying great popularity as he began his second term, but it would be cut short. In September 1901, while attending an exposition in Buffalo, New York, McKinley was shot by an anarchist. He was the third President to be assassinated, all since the Civil War. Vice President Theodore Roosevelt assumed the presidency.

Political corruption was a central issue, which reformers hoped to solve through civil service reforms at the national, state, and local level, replacing political hacks with professional technocrats. The 1883 Civil Service Reform Act (or Pendleton Act), which placed most federal employees on the merit system and marked the end of the so-called "spoils system", permitted the professionalization and rationalization of the federal administration. However, local and municipal government remained in the hands of often-corrupt politicians, political machines, and their local "bosses". Henceforth, the spoils system survived much longer in many states, counties, and municipalities, such as the Tammany Hall ring, which survived well into the 1930s when New York City reformed its own civil service. Illinois modernized its bureaucracy in 1917 under Frank Lowden, but Chicago held out against civil service reform until the 1970s.

Many self-styled progressives saw their work as a crusade against urban political bosses and corrupt "robber barons". There were increased demands for effective regulation of business, a revived commitment to public service, and an expansion of the scope of government to ensure the welfare and interests of the country as the groups pressing these demands saw fit. Almost all the notable figures of the period, whether in politics, philosophy, scholarship, or literature, were connected at least in part with the reform movement.

Trenchant articles dealing with trusts, high finance, impure foods, and abusive railroad practices began to appear in the daily newspapers and in such popular magazines as McClure's and Collier's. Their authors, such as the journalist Ida M. Tarbell, who crusaded against the Standard Oil Trust, became known as "Muckrakers". In his novel, The Jungle, Upton Sinclair exposed unsanitary conditions in the Chicago meat packing houses and the grip of the beef trust on the nation's meat supply.

The hammering impact of Progressive Era writers bolstered aims of certain sectors of the population, especially a middle class caught between political machines and big corporations, to take political action. Many states enacted laws to improve the conditions under which people lived and worked. At the urging of such prominent social critics as Jane Addams, child labor laws were strengthened and new ones adopted, raising age limits, shortening work hours, restricting night work, and requiring school attendance. By the early 20th century, most of the larger cities and more than half the states had established an eight-hour day on public works. Equally important were the Workers' Compensation Laws, which made employers legally responsible for injuries sustained by employees at work. New revenue laws were also enacted, which, by taxing inheritances, laid the groundwork for the contemporary Federal income tax. By the end of the Progressive Era various laws were introduced concerning workplace issues including those related to hours of labor, health and safety, levels of pay, the employment of women and children, compensation for injuries, vacations, and provisions for retirement. In addition, various laws related to social welfare, education and public health were introduced.

Roosevelt's presidency

Roosevelt, a progressive Republican, called for a "Square Deal", and initiated a policy of increased Federal supervision in the enforcement of antitrust laws. Later, extension of government supervision over the railroads prompted the passage of major regulatory bills. One of the bills made published rates the lawful standard, and shippers equally liable with railroads for rebates.

Following Roosevelt's landslide victory in the 1904 election he called for still more drastic railroad regulation, and in June 1906, Congress passed the Hepburn Act. This gave the Interstate Commerce Commission real authority in regulating rates, extended the jurisdiction of the commission, and forced the railroads to surrender their interlocking interests in steamship lines and coal companies. Roosevelt held many meetings, and opened public hearings, in a successful effort to find a compromise for the Coal Strike of 1902, which threatened the fuel supplies of urban America. Meanwhile, Congress had created a new Cabinet Department of Commerce and Labor.

Conservation of the nation's natural resources and beautiful places was a very high priority for Roosevelt, and he raised the national visibility of the issue. The President called for a far-reaching and integrated program of conservation, reclamation and irrigation as early as 1901 in his first annual message to Congress. Whereas his predecessors had set aside 46 million acres (188,000 km²) of timberland for preservation and parks, Roosevelt increased the area to 146 million acres (592,000 km²) and began systematic efforts to prevent forest fires and to retimber denuded tracts. His appointment of his friend Gifford Pinchot as chief forester resulted in vigorous new scientific management of public lands. TR added 50 wildlife refuges, 5 new national parks, and initiated the system of designating national monuments, such as the Devils Tower National Monument.

President Taft

Roosevelt's popularity was at its peak as the campaign of 1908 neared, but he was unwilling to break the tradition by which no President had held office for more than two terms. Instead, he supported William Howard Taft. On the Democratic side, William Jennings Bryan ran for a third time, but managed to carry only the South. Taft, a former judge, first colonial governor of the U.S.-held Philippines and administrator of the Panama Canal Zone, made some progress with his Dollar Diplomacy.

Taft continued the prosecution of trusts, further strengthened the Interstate Commerce Commission, established a postal savings bank and a parcel post system, expanded the civil service, and sponsored the enactment of two amendments to the United States Constitution. The 16th Amendment authorized a federal income tax, while the 17th Amendment, ratified in 1913, mandated the direct election of U.S. Senators by the people, replacing the prior system established in the original Constitution, in which they were selected by state legislatures.

Yet balanced against these achievements was Taft's support for the Payne–Aldrich Tariff Act with protective schedules that outraged progressive opinion. Protection was the ideological cement holding the Republican coalition together. High tariffs were used by Republicans to promise higher sales to business, higher wages to industrial workers, and higher demand for farm products.  Progressive insurgents said it promoted monopoly. Democrats said it was a tax on the little man. It had greatest support in the Northeast, and greatest opposition in the South and West. The Midwest was the battle ground. Insurgents also complained about his opposition to statehood for Arizona because of its progressive constitution; his opposition to environmental activists; and his growing reliance on the conservative wing of his party.  His patron Roosevelt became his enemy by 1910. The Republican Party was divided, and an overwhelming vote swept the Democrats back into control of Congress in the 1910 United States elections.

President Wilson

Two years later, Woodrow Wilson, the Democratic, progressive governor of the state of New Jersey, campaigned against Taft, the Republican candidate, and against Roosevelt who was appalled by his successor's policies and thus broke his earlier pledge to not run for a third term. As the Republicans would not nominate him, he ran as a third-party Progressive Party candidate, but the ticket became widely known as the Bull Moose Party. The election was mainly a contest between Roosevelt and Wilson, Taft receiving little attention and carrying just eight electoral votes.

Wilson, in a spirited campaign, defeated both rivals. Under his leadership, the new Congress enacted one of the most notable legislative programs in American history. Its first task was tariff revision. "The tariff duties must be altered," Wilson said. "We must abolish everything that bears any semblance of privilege." The Underwood Tariff in 1913 provided substantial rate reductions on imported raw materials and foodstuffs, cotton and woolen goods, iron and steel, and removed the duties from more than a hundred other items. Although the act retained many protective features, it was a genuine attempt to lower the cost of living for American workers.

The second item on the Democratic program was a reorganization of the banking and currency system. "Control," said Wilson, "must be public, not private, must be vested in the government itself, so that the banks may be the instruments, not the masters, of business and of individual enterprise and initiative."

Passage of the Federal Reserve Act of 1913 was one of Wilson's most enduring legislative accomplishments, for he successfully negotiated a compromise between Wall Street and the agrarians. The plan built on ideas developed by Senator Nelson Aldrich, who discovered the European nations had more efficient central banks that helped their internal business and international trade. The new organization divided the country into 12 districts, with a Federal Reserve Bank in each, all supervised by a Federal Reserve Board. These banks were owned by local banks and served as depositories for the cash reserves of member banks. Until the Federal Reserve Act, the U.S. government had left control of its money supply largely to unregulated private banks. While the official medium of exchange was gold coins, most loans and payments were carried out with bank notes, backed by the promise of redemption in gold. The trouble with this system was that the banks were tempted to reach beyond their cash reserves, prompting periodic panics during which fearful depositors raced to turn their bank paper into coin. With the passage of the act, greater flexibility in the money supply was assured, and provision was made for issuing federal reserve notes—paper dollars—to meet business demands. The Fed opened in 1914 and played a central role in funding the World War. After 1914, issues of money and banking faded away from the political agenda.

To resolve the long-standing dispute over trusts, the Wilson Administration dropped the "trust-busting" legal strategies of Roosevelt and Taft and relied on the new Federal Trade Commission to issue orders prohibiting "unfair methods of competition" by business concerns in interstate trade. In addition a second law, the Clayton Antitrust Act, forbade many corporate practices that had thus far escaped specific condemnation—interlocking directorates, price discrimination among purchasers, use of the injunction in labor disputes and ownership by one corporation of stock in similar enterprises. After 1914 the trust issue faded away from politics.

The Adamson Act of 1916 established an eight-hour day for railroad labor and solidified the ties between the labor unions and the Democratic Party. The record of achievement won Wilson a firm place in American history as one of the nation's foremost liberal reformers. Wilson's domestic reputation would soon be overshadowed by his record as a wartime President who led his country to victory but could not hold the support of his people for the peace that followed.

World War I

Entry

Firmly maintaining neutrality when World War I began in Europe in 1914, the United States helped supply the Allies, but could not ship anything to the Central Powers because of the British blockade of Germany. Sympathies among many politically and culturally influential Americans had favored the British cause from the start of the war, as typified by industrialist Samuel Insull, born in London, who helped young Americans enlist in British or Canadian forces. On the other hand, especially in the Midwest, many Irish Americans and German Americans opposed any American involvement, the Irish because they hated the British, and the Germans because they feared they would come under personal attack. The suffragist movement included many pacifists, and most churches opposed the war.

German efforts to use their submarines ("U-boats") to blockade Britain resulted in the deaths of American travelers and sailors, and attacks on passenger liners caused public outrage. Most notable was torpedoing without warning the passenger liner Lusitania in 1915. Germany promised not to repeat; however it reversed position in early 1917, believing that unrestricted U-boat warfare against all ships headed to Britain would win the war, albeit at the cost of American entry. When Americans read the text of the German offer to Mexico, known as the Zimmermann Telegram, they saw an offer for Mexico to go to war with Germany against the United States, with German funding, with the promise of the return of the lost territories of Arizona, New Mexico, and Texas. On Apr 1, 1917, Wilson called for war, emphasizing that the U.S. had to fight to maintain its honor and to have a decisive voice in shaping the new postwar world. Congress voted on April 6, 1917, to declare war, but it was far from unanimous.

Germania

German Americans were sometimes accused of being too sympathetic to the German Empire. Former president Theodore Roosevelt denounced "hyphenated Americanism", insisting that dual loyalties were impossible in wartime. A small minority came out for Germany, or ridiculed the British. About 1% of the 480,000 enemy aliens of German birth were imprisoned in 1917–18. The allegations included spying for Germany, or endorsing the German war effort. Thousands were forced to buy war bonds to show their loyalty. One person was killed by a mob; in Collinsville, Illinois, German-born Robert Prager was dragged from jail as a suspected spy and lynched. The war saw a phobia of anything German engulf the nation; sauerkraut was rechristened "liberty cabbage".

Patriotism
The Wilson Administration created the Committee on Public Information (CPI) to control war information and provide pro-war propaganda. The private American Protective League, working with the Federal Bureau of Investigation, was one of many private right-wing "patriotic associations" that sprang up to support the war and at the same time fight labor unions and various left-wing and anti-war organizations. The U.S. Congress passed, and Wilson signed, the Espionage Act of 1917 and the Sedition Act of 1918. The Sedition Act criminalized any expression of opinion that used "disloyal, profane, scurrilous or abusive language" about the U.S. government, flag or armed forces. Government police action, private vigilante groups and public war hysteria compromised the civil liberties of many Americans who disagreed with Wilson's policies.

Draft

The United States was remarkably unprepared for war in 1917, since it had not fought a major conflict since 1865. The military was small by modern standards and used out-dated weapons. A hasty expansion and modernization of the armed forces was thus launched. The draft began in spring 1917 but volunteers were also accepted. Four million men and thousands of women joined the services for the duration.

Economic confusion in 1917
In terms of munitions production, the 15 months after April 1917 involved an amazing parade of mistakes, misguided  enthusiasm, and confusion. Americans were willing enough, but they did not know their proper role. Washington was unable to figure out what to do when, or even to decide who was in charge. Typical of the confusion was the coal shortage that hit in December 1917. Because coal was by far the major source of energy and heat a grave crisis ensued. There was in fact plenty of coal being mined, but 44,000 loaded freight and coal cars were tied up in horrendous traffic jams in the rail yards of the East Coast. Two hundred ships were waiting in New York Harbor for cargo that was delayed by the mess. The solution included nationalizing the coal mines and the railroads for the duration, shutting down factories one day a week to save fuel, and enforcing a strict system of priorities. Only in March 1918 did Washington finally take control of the crisis

Women
The war saw many women taking what were traditionally men's jobs for the first time. Many worked on the assembly lines of factories, producing tanks, trucks and munitions. For the first time, department stores employed African American women as elevator operators and cafeteria waitresses. The Food Administration helped housewives prepare nutritious meals with less waste and with optimum use of the foods available. Most important, the morale of the women remained high, as millions joined the Red Cross as volunteers to help soldiers and their families. With rare exceptions, the women did not protest the draft.

Labor
Samuel Gompers, head of the American Federation of Labor, and nearly all labor unions were strong supporters of the war effort. They minimized strikes as wages soared and full employment was reached. The AFL unions strongly encouraged their young men to enlist in the military, and fiercely opposed efforts to reduce recruiting and slow war production by the anti-war labor union called the Industrial Workers of the World (IWW) and also left-wing Socialists. President Wilson appointed Gompers to the powerful Council of National Defense, where he set up the War Committee on Labor. The AFL membership soared to 2.4 million in 1917. In 1919, the Union tried to make their gains permanent and called a series of major strikes in meat, steel and other industries. The strikes, all of which failed, forced unions back to their position around 1910. Anti-war socialists controlled the IWW, which fought against the war effort and was in turn shut down by legal action by the federal government.

Over there
On the battlefields of the Western Front in spring 1918, the fresh American Expeditionary Forces troops were enthusiastically welcomed by the war-weary Allied armies in the summer of 1918. They arrived at the rate of 10,000 a day, at a time that the Imperial German Army was unable to replace its losses. After the Allies turned back the powerful final German offensive (Spring Offensive), the Americans played a central role in the Allied final offensive (Hundred Days Offensive). Victory over Germany was achieved on November 11, 1918.

Using questionnaires filled out by doughboys as they left the Army, Gutièrrez reported they were not cynical or disillusioned. They fought "for honor, manhood, comrades, and adventure, but especially for duty."

Treaty
Britain, France and Italy imposed severe economic penalties on Germany in the Treaty of Versailles. The United States Senate did not ratify the Treaty of Versailles; instead, the United States signed separate peace treaties with Germany and her allies. The Senate also refused to enter the newly created League of Nations on Wilson's terms, and Wilson rejected the Senate's compromise proposal.

See also
 Thomas Alva Edison
 Turn of the century
 History of the United States (1918–1945)
 Timeline of United States history (1860–1899)
 Timeline of United States history (1900–1929)
 Timeline of the American Old West
 Presidency of Abraham Lincoln
 Presidency of Andrew Johnson
 Presidency of Ulysses S. Grant
 Presidency of Rutherford B. Hayes
 Presidency of James A. Garfield
 Presidency of Chester A. Arthur
 Presidency of Grover Cleveland
 Presidency of Benjamin Harrison
 Presidency of William McKinley
 Presidency of Theodore Roosevelt
 Presidency of William Howard Taft
 Presidency of Woodrow Wilson

Notes

Further reading
 Carnes, Mark C., and John A. Garraty, The American Nation: A History of the United States (14th ed. 2011); university and AP textbook
 
 Divine, Robert A. et al.  America Past and Present (8th ed. 2011), university textbook
 Foner, Eric. Give Me Liberty! An American History (3rd ed. 2011), university textbook
, university textbook
 
 Paxson, Frederic L. Recent History Of The United States 1865-1929 (1929) online old survey by scholar
 Tindall, George B., and David E. Shi. America: A Narrative History (8th ed. 2009), university textbook
 White, Richard. The Republic for Which It Stands: The United States during Reconstruction and the Gilded Age, 1865-1896 (Oxford History of the United States, 2017).

Reconstruction: 1863–1877
See Reconstruction Bibliography for much longer guide.
 Fleming, Walter Lynwood,  The Sequel of Appomattox, A Chronicle of the Reunion of the States(1918) short survey from Dunning School
 Foner, Eric and Mahoney, Olivia. America's Reconstruction: People and Politics After the Civil War. , short well-illustrated survey
 Foner, Eric. A Short History of Reconstruction (1990) excerpt and text search
 Foner, Eric. Reconstruction: America's Unfinished Revolution, 1863–1877 (1988), highly detailed history of Reconstruction emphasizing Black and abolitionist perspective
 Hamilton, Peter Joseph. The Reconstruction Period (1906), history of era using Dunning School 570 pp; chapter on each state
 Nevins, Allan. The Emergence of Modern America 1865–1878 (1927)
 Stalcup, Brenda. ed. Reconstruction: Opposing Viewpoints (1995). Text uses primary documents to present opposing viewpoints.
 Summers, Mark Wahlgren. The Ordeal of the Reunion: A New History of Reconstruction (2014) excerpt

Gilded Age: 1877–1896

 Buenker, John D. and Joseph Buenker, eds. Encyclopedia of the Gilded Age and Progressive Era. (3 vol 2005). ; 900 essays by 200 scholars
 Cherny, Robert W. American Politics in the Gilded Age, 1868–1900 (1997) 
 Dewey, Davis R. National Problems: 1880–1897 (1907) online
 Edwards, Rebecca. New Spirits: Americans in the Gilded Age, 1865–1905 (2005); 304pp excerpt and text search
Faulkner, Harold U.; Politics, Reform, and Expansion, 1890–1900 (1959), scholarly survey, strong on economic and political history online
Fine, Sidney. Laissez Faire and the General-Welfare State: A Study of Conflict in American Thought, 1865–1901. University of Michigan Press, 1956.
 Ford, Henry Jones. The Cleveland Era: A Chronicle of the New Order in Politics (1921), short overview online
Garraty, John A. The New Commonwealth, 1877–1890, 1968 scholarly survey, strong on economic and political history
 Hoffmann, Charles. "The depression of the nineties." Journal of Economic History 16#2 (1956): 137–164. in JSTOR
 Hoffmann, Charles. Depression of the nineties; an economic history (1970)
Jensen, Richard. "Democracy, Republicanism and Efficiency: The Values of American Politics, 1885–1930," in Byron Shafer and Anthony Badger, eds, Contesting Democracy: Substance and Structure in American Political History, 1775–2000 (U of Kansas Press, 2001) pp 149–180; online version
 Kirkland, Edward C. Industry Comes of Age, Business, Labor, and Public Policy 1860–1897 (1961), standard survey
Kleppner; Paul. The Third Electoral System 1853–1892: Parties, Voters, and Political Cultures U of North Carolina Press, (1979) online
Morgan, H. Wayne ed. The Gilded Age: A Reappraisal Syracuse University Press 1970. interpretive essays
 Morgan, H. Wayne, From Hayes to McKinley: National Party Politics, 1877–1896 (1969)
 Nevins, Allan. John D. Rockefeller: The Heroic Age of American Enterprise (1940); 710pp; favorable scholarly biography; online
 Nevins, Allan. The Emergence of Modern America, 1865–1878 (1933) , social history
 Oberholtzer, Ellis Paxson. A History of the United States since the Civil War. Volume V, 1888–1901 (Macmillan, 1937).  791pp; comprehensive old-fashioned political history 
 Rhodes, James Ford. History of the United States from the Compromise of 1850: 1877-1896 (1919) online complete; old, factual and heavily political, by winner of Pulitzer Prize
Shannon, Fred A.  The farmer's last frontier: agriculture, 1860–1897 (1945) complete text online
Smythe, Ted Curtis; The Gilded Age Press, 1865–1900 Praeger. 2003.

Progressive Era: 1896–1917
Buenker, John D. and Joseph Buenker, eds. Encyclopedia of the Gilded Age and Progressive Era. (3 vol 2005) ; 900 essays by 200 scholars
Buenker, John D., John C. Burnham, and Robert M. Crunden. Progressivism (1986)
Buenker, John D. Dictionary of the Progressive Era (1980)
Cooper, John Milton. Woodrow Wilson: A Biography (2009)
Diner, Steven J. A Very Different Age: Americans of the Progressive Era (1998)

Gould, Lewis L. America in the Progressive Era, 1890–1914" (2000)
Gould, Lewis L. ed., The Progressive Era (1974), essays by scholars
Hays, Samuel P. The Response to Industrialism, 1885–1914 (1957),
Hofstadter, Richard The Age of Reform (1954), Pulitzer Prize
Jensen, Richard. "Democracy, Republicanism and Efficiency: The Values of American Politics, 1885–1930," in Byron Shafer and Anthony Badger, eds, Contesting Democracy: Substance and Structure in American Political History, 1775–2000 (U of Kansas Press, 2001) pp 149–180; online version
 Kagan Robert. The Ghost at the Feast: America and the Collapse of World Order, 1900-1941 (Knopf, 2023) excerpt
Kennedy, David M. ed., Progressivism: The Critical Issues (1971), readings
Mann, Arthur. ed., The Progressive Era (1975), readings
McGerr, Michael. A Fierce Discontent: The Rise and Fall of the Progressive Movement in America, 1870–1920 (2003)
Mowry, George. The Era of Theodore Roosevelt and the Birth of Modern America, 1900–1912. survey by leading scholar
 Pease, Otis, ed. The Progressive Years: The Spirit and Achievement of American Reform (1962), primary documents
 Thelen, David P. "Social Tensions and the Origins of Progressivism," Journal of American History 56 (1969), 323-341 in JSTOR
 ;  904pp; full scale scholarly biography; winner of Pulitzer Prize; online free; 2nd ed. 1965
 Wiebe, Robert. The Search For Order, 1877–1920 (1967), influential interpretation

World Affairs and World War I: 1917–1918
 Beale Howard K. Theodore Roosevelt and the Rise of America to World Power (1956).
 Beaver, Daniel R. Newton D. Baker and the American War Effort, 1917–1919 (1966)
 Coffman, Edward M. The War to End All Wars: The American Military Experience in World War I (1998)
 Cooper, John Milton. Woodrow Wilson: A Biography (2009)
 Hallas, James H. Doughboy War: The American Expeditionary Force in World War I (2000)
 Keene, Jennifer D. "Remembering the “Forgotten War”: American Historiography on World War I." Historian 78#3 (2016): 439-468.
 Kennedy, David M. Over Here: The First World War and American Society (1982)], covers politics & economics & society
 May, Ernest R. The World War and American Isolation, 1914–1917 (1959)
  Meyer  G.J. The World Remade: America In World War I (2017), popular survey, 672pp
 Slosson, Preston William. The Great Crusade and after, 1914–1928 (1930)], social and cultural history
 Venzon, Anne ed. The United States in the First World War: An Encyclopedia (1995)

Primary sources
 Link, William A., and Susannah J. Link, eds. The Gilded Age and Progressive Era: A Documentary Reader'' (2012)  excerpt and text search

External links

 H-SHGAPE  discussion forum for people studying the Gilded Age and Progressive Era
 Photographs of prominent politicians, 1861-1922; these are pre-1923 and out of copyright
 Fordham University Links on American Imperialism
The Gilder Lehrman Institute of American History
Shapell Manuscript Foundation

1860s in the United States
1870s in the United States
1880s in the United States
1890s in the United States
1900s in the United States
1910s in the United States
Progressive Era in the United States